The Guru Gobind Singh Stadium is the main sports venue in Nanded, in the Indian state of Maharashtra. It is used mostly for cricket matches. The stadium is named after Guru Gobind Singh, the 10th Guru of Sikhs, who made Nanded his permanent abode and passed here Guruship to Guru Granth Sahib before his death in 1708.

History 

Two Ranji trophy matches were played here, one in 1980/81 between Maharashtra & Bombay (Now, Mumbai) team and other in 1983/84 between Maharashtra & Saurashtra team. Riaz Poonawala had scored 133 runs here against Saurashtra team in the later match. Highest partnership was of 134 runs between GA Parkar & RD Parkar against Bombay team in first match played here. 2nd highest 102 runs partnership between Bombay team players AV Mankad & ED Solkar was made in 1980/81 against Maharashtra team. 
This stadium ground was also used for political rallies and other cultural programmes till recent past (2014). 400 Meter standard running track was built on ground prior to Cricket pitch.

Development 
Under state government sports policy former India captain Dilip Vengsarkar visited here in 2014 for inspection and offered assistance regarding development plan for international standard Cricket ground. This stadium was undergoing renovation since then to have international standard Cricket pitch and 87 yard ground area, all this are now ready in 2017. Ground has 4 main pitch with 6 more pitches for practice purpose. Entire ground has lush green outfield with advanced water sprinkle and drainage system installed. VIP pavilion is built on one side. Canopy structure roof, flood lights and parking area will be ready by end of 2017. NWCMC stadium manager Mr. Ramesh Choure has taken efforts to develop the ground. Proposal to host domestic Ranji Trophy & ODI matches has been sent to Maharashtra Cricket Association (MCA). Test, T20, IPL matches will be likely played too in near future. Development is going on in a pretty nice way and people in Nanded (Nandedkar) are expecting cricket matches to be played here soon.

Additional Facilities 
SGGS stadium campus also hosts well developed indoor sports hall for Badminton and other sports events. Rest rooms for players are also available.

How To Reach 
Shri Guru Gobind Singh Airport to stadium distance is about 6 km and Hazur Sahib Nanded railway station (NED) is close than a kilometer distance. Nanded is also well connected to Mumbai, Pune, Nagpur, Hyderabad by road. City Bus and Hire Auto-Rickshaws available for local transit.

See also

 Stadium picture
 Outfield Photo - Drone Cam. (Dec. 2016) (Credit-Sachin Mohite, Photo Journalist)
 Green outfield (June 2017) (Credit- Ramesh Choure, Stadium Manager)

References

Cricket grounds in Maharashtra
Multi-purpose stadiums in India
Sports venues in Maharashtra
Nanded
Memorials to Guru Gobind Singh
Year of establishment missing